1st class Active State Councillor of the Russian Federation is the highest federal state civilian service rank of Russia. The following list is a list of all persons who was promoted to this rank during the period 2015–2019:

 Alexander Petrikov
 Roman Starovoyt
 Vladimir Artamonov
 Natalia Udalova
 Sergey Vasiliev
 Alexey Vovchenko
 Pavel Korolev
 Alexander Plutnik
 Oleg Fomichev
 Tatyana Voronova
 Mikhail Kashtan
 Alexey Uvarov
 Alexey Abramov
 Gulnaz Kadyrova
 Gleb Nikitin
 Alexander Povalko
 Sergey Tsyb
 Lev Sherbakov
 Odes Baysultanov
 Valentina Stukalova
 Alexander Savenkov
 Alexander Kolpakov
 Nikolay Abroskin
 Pavel Fradkov
 Maxim Akimov
 Liana Pepelyaeva
 Ivan Kharchenko
 Sergey Menyaylo
 Anna Kulikova
 Nikolay Tsukanov
 Andrey Yarin
 Nikolay Arkhipov
 Oleg Frolov
 Svetlana Radchenko
 Yekaterina Yegorova
 Sergey Novikov
 Oleg Savelyev
 Nikolay Asaul
 Grigory Lekarev
 Marina Tomilova
 Ilya Shestakov
 Vladimir Stepanov
 Sergey Bulavin
 Andrey Slepnev
 Yevgeny Dietrich
 Viktor Yevtukhov
 Lyubov Yeltsova
 Yury Zubarev
 Alla Manilova
 Andrey Pudov
 Alexander Matveev
 Igor Diveykin
 Olga Sitnikova
 Marina Volkova
 Oleg Martyanov
 Viktor Basargin
 Pavel Volkov
 Sergey Nazarov
 Alexander Kharichev
 Dmitry Verbovoy
 Igor Zadvornov
 Andrey Cherezov
 Alexander Yurchik
 Alexander Gutsan
 Igor Komarov
 Igor Neverov
 Anatoly Kirienko
 Alexey Aleshin
 Anna Popova
 Savva Shipov
 Timur Ivanov
 Vladimir Lozbinev
 Alexey Filatov
 Sergey Martynov
 Yevgeny Derbenev
 Olga Krivonos
 Vadim Filatov
 Yury Gordeev
 Leonid Gornin
 Vadim Zhivulin
 Alexey Moiseev
 Vasily Osmakov
 Irina Potekhina
 Ilya Trunin
 Vladimir Chepets
 Tatyana Lokatkina
 Mikhail Popov
 Olga Sergun

See also
 State civilian and municipal service ranks in Russian Federation

References

Federal state civilian service ranks in the Russian Federation